The School Enterprise Challenge is an international competition for schools to establish profitable student-led businesses.

Since 2011, the competition  has benefited over 80,000 young people directly from over 90 countries.  It was a WISE Awards 2014 finalist.

References

External links

Wise-qatar.org
Euronews.com
 Newindianexpress.com

Business education
Recurring events established in 2011